Alfredo Carrillo (born 1 September 1976) is a Paraguayan swimmer. He competed in the men's 50 metre freestyle event at the 1996 Summer Olympics.

References

1976 births
Living people
Paraguayan male swimmers
Olympic swimmers of Paraguay
Swimmers at the 1996 Summer Olympics
Place of birth missing (living people)
20th-century Paraguayan people